Raijū (雷獣, "thunder animal" or "thunder beast") is a legendary creature from Japanese mythology.

Mythology
Its body is composed of lightning and with the form of a white and blue wolf or dog (or even a wolf or dog wrapped in lightning) being the most common, although it can be represented with other forms such as tanuki, leopard, fox, weasel, marten, tiger, cat, bear, porcupine, tapir, elephant, rat, rabbit, bat, squirrel, boar, deer, badger, mongoose, civet, insectivoran, pangolin, monkey, rhinoceros, sea creature (usually a marine mammal such as a dugong, whale, dolphin, porpoise or seal, although it can also take form of a fish, mollusk or crustacean), insect, arachnid, millipede, centipede, qilin or dragon. It may also fly about as a ball of lightning (in fact, the creature may be an attempt to explain the phenomenon of lightning, such as ball lightning). Its cry sounds like thunder.

Raiju is the companion of the Raijin, the Shinto god of lightning. While the beast is generally calm and harmless, during thunderstorms it becomes agitated, and leaps about in trees, fields, and even buildings (trees that have been struck by lightning are said to have been scratched by Raiju's claws).

Another of Raiju's peculiar behaviors is sleeping in human navels. This prompts the Raijin to shoot lightning arrows at Raiju to wake the creature up, and thus harms the person in whose belly the demon is resting. Superstitious people therefore often sleep on their stomachs during bad weather, but other legends say that Raiju will only hide in the navels of people who sleep outdoors.

Origin 
It is believed that the myth of Raiju originated from the Chinese materia medica text Bencao Gangmu. Scholars believe that Raiju citings and documentation during the Edo period in the history of Japan. However, it is also believed that sky being an unexplored territory in and western scientific and technological knowledge had not reached Japan, the mysterious phenomenon of thunder and lightning were attributed to the notoriety of Raiju.

Raijus are given negative connotations as many things were happening in the sky, beyond human beings of Edo period's reach. While the depths of oceans were also inaccessible to human reason, oceans were helping humans with fishes (food) and sustained life forms. In this sense, phenomena of the sky were transcendental and given negative connotations to the phenomena and the creature.

Scientific attempts 
Dead animals were found from under trees after a stormy night in Japan. Attempts were made to debunk this myth. It was claimed that dead Raijus are essentially real dead animals startled or knocked off from the tree during tempestuous weather of Japan. Recent theory suggests that Raijus are essentially a small tree-dwelling creature called hakubishin (Paguma larvata) found in East Asian countries such as China and Taiwan. While, some scholar believe that Paguma larvata was brought by soldiers of World War II as pets, the bearish resemblance of Raijus in paintings from Edo period also suggest that Paguma larvata (Masked palm civet) have been in Japan since much earlier. The gem-faced civet has also been considered the inspiration for legends of the kuda-gitsune.

See also

References

Dragons
Japanese deities
Japanese ghosts
Mythological arthropods
Mythological bears
Mythological canines
Mythological deer
Mythological dogs
Mythological felines
Mythological pigs
Mythological rodents
Mythological molluscs
Sea monsters
Shinto kami
Thunder deities
Wolves in folklore, religion and mythology
Yaoguai
Yōkai